Guy Rowson (1883 - 16 November 1937) was a British Labour Party politician who served as the Member of Parliament (MP) for Farnworth in Lancashire. He was elected in 1929, defeated in 1931, and re-elected in 1935, until his death in 1937. He was Parliamentary Private Secretary to the then Labour leader of the opposition, Clement Attlee. In 1936, he was responsible for the introduction of the Annual Holiday Bill, which regulated holiday pay for workers.

Mining
Rowson became a coal miner at age 12. In 1923, he became a Miners' Agent in the Lancashire and Cheshire Miners' Federation.

Other activities
In 1907 he joined the Social Democratic Federation, and in 1910 he stood as a Socialist for the Tyldesley Urban District Council. where he was defeated, but elected in 1919, where he served until 1925.

Quotes
In his memoires, British Prime Minister Clement Attlee wrote:
"I appointed a Lancashire miner, Guy Rowson, as my Parliamentary Private Secretary, but his early death cut short a promising career."

Personal
Born in 1883 in Ellenbrook, near Worsley in Lancashire, he was the son of a coal miner, Joseph Rowson  and his wife Mary.

References

1883 births
1937 deaths
Labour Party (UK) MPs for English constituencies
Miners' Federation of Great Britain-sponsored MPs
UK MPs 1929–1931
UK MPs 1935–1945
People from Walkden
Councillors in Lancashire
Labour Party (UK) councillors